Arbabi (also Romanized as Ārbābī; also known as Deh-e Arbābī) is a village in Qorqori Rural District, Qorqori District, Hirmand County, Sistan and Baluchestan Province, Iran. At the 2006 census, its population was 662, in 139 families.

References 

Populated places in Hirmand County